Hatfield Peverel railway station is on the Great Eastern Main Line in the East of England, serving the villages of Hatfield Peverel and Nounsley, Essex. Its three-letter station code is HAP.

The station is managed by Greater Anglia, which also operates all trains serving it, as part of the East Anglia franchise.

History
The original Hatfield Peverel station was opened  in late 1844 but was destroyed by fire in early 1849. It was later re-built on the current site and opened in 1878, known as "Hatfield Peveril" until the spelling was amended in 1880. There was a private station just to the west for Boreham House between 1843 and 1877.

An 1897 plan of the station shows two goods sidings on the up-side at the London end and a further siding  at the country end also on the up-side. There was a refuge siding added at a later date on the down-side at the London end.

Goods traffic was ended on 27 June 1960.

Services
The following services typically call at Hatfield Peverel during off-peak hours:

At peak times service frequencies may be increased and calling patterns varied.

References

External links

Railway stations in Essex
DfT Category D stations
Former Great Eastern Railway stations
Greater Anglia franchise railway stations
Railway stations in Great Britain opened in 1844
Hatfield Peverel